Dudley is an American sitcom television series starring Dudley Moore (in his episodic TV debut) and Joanna Cassidy. The series premiered on April 16, 1993, on CBS, temporarily replacing Major Dad on Friday nights. It was canceled on May 14, 1993, with one episode remaining unaired.

Synopsis
The series focuses on the "forced" cohabitation between Dudley Bristol, a mature divorced cabaret pianist, and his 14-year-old son Fred.

Cast
 Dudley Moore as Dudley Bristol
 Joanna Cassidy as Laraine Bristol
 Harley Cross as Fred Bristol
 Max Wright as Paul
 Joel Brooks as Harold Krowten 
 Lupe Ontiveros as Marta

Episodes

Awards
 1993 Emmy Awards Nominee - Graphic design and title sequences - William B. Pittard, Frances Schifrin, Jennifer Grey Berkowitz, Darin Kirchne
 1993 Emmy Awards Nominee - Lighting direction (electronic), comedy series - George Spiro Dibie, Kim Killingsworth

References

Alex McNeil, Total television: the comprehensive guide to programming from 1948 to the present, Penguin Books, 1996

External links

1993 American television series debuts
1993 American television series endings
1990s American sitcoms
Television shows set in New York City
CBS original programming
Television series by 20th Century Fox Television
Television series by CBS Studios
English-language television shows